Tumby Island Conservation Park is a protected area in the Australian state of South Australia associated with Tumby Island in Spencer Gulf and located about  southeast of the town of Tumby Bay.  

The conservation park consists of land described as "section 682, north out of hundreds, county of Flinders", being the entirety of Tumby Island. The land first acquired protected area status as a fauna conservation reserve declared on 9 January 1969 under the Fauna Conservation Act 1964-1965. On 27 April 1972, the fauna conservation reserve was reconstituted as the Tumby Island Conservation Park under the National Parks and Wildlife Act 1972. On 19 December 1991, additional land was added to the conservation park to extend protection over land located between high tide and low tide.

The area under protection is considered significant for the following reason: "a small island providing feeding and roosting habitat for seabirds."

The conservation park is classified as an IUCN Category Ia protected area.  In 1980, it was listed on the now-defunct Register of the National Estate.

References

External links
Tumby Island Conservation Park webpage on protected planet

Conservation parks of South Australia
Protected areas established in 1969
1969 establishments in Australia
Spencer Gulf
South Australian places listed on the defunct Register of the National Estate